Tripura is a 2015 Telugu horror-action film directed by Raj Kiran, starring Swathi Reddy and Naveen Chandra in the lead roles and produced by A Chinna Babu and M Rajasekhar. Kamran composed the film's soundtrack. This Movie Also dubbed in Hindi & Tamil by The Same Title by Zee Cinema & Zee Thirai.

Plot 
Tripura is a story about the village background. Tripura (Swathi Reddy) is a village girl who has weird dreams, and all those dreams come true. Tripura is taken to Hyderabad for her treatment about the dreams. There she meets a doctor, (Naveen Chandra), and they both fall in love and get married. They soon move into a big penthouse. Soon Tripura notices paranormal activities. The doctor's friend goes missing. As time passes, Tripura continues to get these dreams, until one day where she sees herself killing her husband with a knife. Naveen's friend, a police officer (Tilak Shekar) is intending to search for his and Naveen's friend. When the police officer tells Tripura that Naveen killed their friend and that he will kill her also. When Naveen reached home, he saw that Tripura was nowhere to be found. When he saw her, Tripura stabbed him. By the time the police officer had come at their house. Naveen tells Tripura that he did not kill her, but the police officer had killed their friend. So, when he tries to kill both of them, the ghost of the friend arrives and kills the police officer. Then the screen cuts black.

Cast 
 Swathi Reddy as Tripura
 Naveen Chandra as Tripura's husband
 Rao Ramesh ad psychology professor
 Saptagiri as Tripura's cousin
 Sivannarayana Naripeddi as Tripura's father
 Jaya Prakash Reddy
 Tilak Shekar as the Police Officer
 Pooja Ramachandran
 Preeti Nigam as Tripura's servant
 Sriman as Taddi Taapaarao

Soundtrack

Reception 
A critic from Deccan Chronicle wrote that "The highlight of the second half is the comedy scenes by Shakalaka Shankar and Jayaprakash Reddy. It gives a much-needed relief and boost to the film. Saptagiri has a full-length role, but sometimes he goes overboard, though he manages to evoke a laugh most of the time. Pooja in a cameo looks neat. The music is average though the dialogues are catchy".

References

External links
 

Indian action horror films
Indian sequel films
2010s Telugu-language films
Films set in Hyderabad, India
Indian comedy horror films
Indian supernatural thriller films